Herbert Watkin Williams-Wynn (29 April 1822 – 22 June 1862) was a British Conservative politician.

Williams-Wynn was elected MP for Montgomeryshire at a by-election in 1850—caused by the death of Charles Williams-Wynn—and held the seat until his own death in 1862.

References

External links
 

Conservative Party (UK) MPs for Welsh constituencies
UK MPs 1847–1852
UK MPs 1852–1857
UK MPs 1857–1859
UK MPs 1859–1865
1822 births
1862 deaths